Cima Valdritta is the highest summit of the Monte Baldo mountain range and thereby part of the Garda Mountains in northern Italy.

Morphology 
The Cima Valdritta summit is the highest peak of the Monte Baldo range, that roughly extends from north to south. Other prominent peaks in the range are Punta Telegrafo to the south and Cima delle Pozzette to the north. On the western slopes is the impressive Valdritta cirque. The summit is rocky and just above the tree line.

Climbing 
The summit can be reached from the south via Punta Telegrafo, from the north as a long hike over the Monte Baldo mountain ridge, from the west through the Valdritta cirque or fastest from the east, a steep track starting at the country road SP3.

See also
 List of Alpine peaks by prominence

References

External links

Mountains of the Alps
Mountains of Veneto
Mountains of Trentino
Garda Mountains
Two-thousanders of Italy